B-Side Babies is a compilation album  by English new wave musician Adam Ant, released by Epic Records in 1994. It is not to be confused with The B-Sides, a 7 inch EP of "Friends" b/w "Kick"/"Physical", released by Do It Records in 1982.

Consisting primarily of single B-sides—both solo and with the Ants—the collection is described in the following manner on the back cover of the CD:

Most of the tracks on this collection were fairly well known to Adam Ant fans, regardless of whether or not they owned any of the singles. "Beat My Guest" was the first song Adam and the Ants played at their debut gig at the ICA restaurant in May 1977. "Fall-In" is an old Ants song from 1977, co-written with Lester Square. "Red Scab", "Juanito the Bandito" and "B-Side Baby" also date back to 1977. "It Doesn't Matter" was performed at a John Peel session on 23 January 1978, and "Physical" and "Friends" were performed at a Peel session on 10 July 1978. "Christian D'or", originally called "Christian Dior", is also from 1978, as are "Why Do Girls Love Horses?" and "Greta X". The "extra special treat never before released anywhere" is a previously unreleased version of "It Doesn't Matter".

"Physical" was later covered by Nine Inch Nails, and appears as one of the two bonus songs on their 1992 EP Broken.

Track listing

References 

Adam Ant albums
Epic Records compilation albums
B-side compilation albums
1994 compilation albums